The sexual abuse scandal in the Milwaukee Archdiocese is a series of sexual-abuse cases that occurred in the Roman Catholic Archdiocese of Milwaukee, Wisconsin, US.

Lawrence Murphy case
Lawrence Murphy was a priest who taught at the former St. John School for the Deaf in the Milwaukee suburb of St. Francis from 1950 to 1974. He is believed to have molested up to 200 deaf boys before the mid-1970s. Local law enforcement agencies, including the Milwaukee Police Department, the St. Francis police, and the Milwaukee County District Attorney, were informed of the abuse in 1974 by adult graduates of the St. John School for the Deaf, but expressed doubts about the credibility of the allegations and the statute of limitations, and did not proceed.

Then Milwaukee Archbishop William Edward Cousins gave Murphy a leave of absence in 1974 and allowed him to move to his mother's house in Boulder Junction, Wisconsin, which is in the Diocese of Superior. In September 1981 the Chancellor of the Archdiocese wrote the Bishop of Superior asking him to consider taking Murphy as a priest of Superior, but the suggestion was not acted upon. Murphy finally retired as a priest of the Archdiocese of Milwaukee in January 1993. Rembert Weakland, Archbishop of Milwaukee, had Murphy evaluated by a psychotherapist in December 1993. During the interview, Murphy admitted molesting boys at least up until 1974, including during the sacrament of penance, which is an offense under canon law. In July 1996, Weakland notified the Congregation for the Doctrine of the Faith and asked how to proceed. Although the Congregation for the Doctrine of the Faith at the time did not have jurisdiction over most incidents involving sexual abuse by priests, it did have authority over cases involving solicitation by priests during the sacrament of penance. Weakland stated that "[I] got an answer back saying yes. We could open the case", and the process against Murphy was begun in October 1996. Cardinal Tarcisio Bertone instructed Wisconsin bishops to convene a canonical trial, which could have resulted in a range of punishments, including laicization. A formal church trial was initiated but later dropped because Archbishop Weakland decided that a pastoral solution was more appropriate because Murphy was elderly and in poor health. Murphy died several months after he requested that the Vatican halt a canonical trial against him because of his ill health.

The Vatican has responded to concerns by noting that they had not been informed of the allegations until 20 years after they were first raised; that Murphy died within two years of Vatican notification of the allegations; that police investigations into the allegations at the time did not result in any cases being heard; and that there was nothing in the Vatican's actions that would prevent civil cases from proceeding. As of March 2010, there were four outstanding lawsuits against the Archdiocese of Milwaukee in the case.

Cover-ups of reports of sex abuse
In 1984, Archbishop Weakland responded to teachers in a Catholic school who were reporting sexual abuse by local priests by stating "any libelous material found in your letter will be scrutinized carefully by our lawyers." The Wisconsin Court of Appeals rebuked him for this, calling his remarks "abrupt" and "insensitive". In 1994, Weakland said those reporting sexual abuse were "squealing". He later apologized for the remarks.

According to the Milwaukee Journal Sentinel, a deposition released in 2009 revealed that Weakland shredded reports about sexual abuse by priests. Weakland admitted allowing priests guilty of child sex abuse to continue as priests without warning parishioners or alerting the police. Weakland stated in his autobiography that in the early years of the sexual abuse scandal he did not understand that child sexual abuse was a crime.

2003 report on sexual abuse
Following public testimony by victims before a combined session of the Wisconsin State Senate and Assembly Judiciary Committee, a report on the sexual abuse of minors by clergy in the Roman Catholic Archdiocese of Milwaukee was published in September 2003. In response, Archbishop Timothy Dolan held a meeting with victims, mental health professionals, law enforcement officers, and clergy.

Dolan helped the archdiocese avoid bankruptcy resulting from the lawsuits, and closed a $3 million budget deficit in 2008. He later called the sexual abuse scandals the most challenging issue of his tenure in Milwaukee, saying "Does it haunt me? Yes it does. And I'm not afraid to admit that." Dolan said the church has made significant progress on addressing the scandal but that much work remains.

2011 bankruptcy filing
The archdiocese said that these additional cases would incur legal fees the diocese could not afford. The archdiocese has assets of about $98.4 million, but $90 million of that is already allocated. An attorney for some of the victims alleges that there were more than 8,000 cases of abuse by more than 100 staff.

Renamed buildings
On March 18, 2019, it was announced that former Archbishops William Cousins and Rembert Weakland would have their names removed from buildings in the Archdiocese of Milwaukee due to their poor handling of sex abuse cases. The renaming of office center which were named in their honor commenced on March 22, 2019.

Franciscan Friars controversy

On September 3, 2020, it was revealed that Wisconsin Franciscan Friar Paul West was extradited to Mississippi on sex abuse charges. Father James Gannon, the leader of a Wisconsin-based group of Franciscan Friars, had previous negotiated settlements for some of West's accusers in Mississippi. In addition to the Mississippi sex abuse charges, West has been charged with sex-degree sexual assault of a child in Wisconsin.

See also
Child sexual abuse
Religious abuse
Sexual misconduct
Spiritual abuse
Mea Maxima Culpa: Silence in the House of God

References

External links
Archdiocese of Milwaukee
 Sexual Abuse Prevention & Response Services
 Sexual Abuse Information
 Safeguarding All of God's Family

Catholic Church sexual abuse scandals in the United States
Incidents of violence against boys
Roman Catholic Archdiocese of Milwaukee
Violence against children
Violence against men in North America